Atigun Pass, elevation , is a high mountain pass across the Brooks Range in Alaska, located at the head of the Dietrich River. It is where the Dalton Highway crosses the Continental Divide (at mile marker 244), and is the highest pass in Alaska that is maintained throughout the year. Atigun is the only pass in the Brooks Range that is crossed by a road. The pass has been responsible for taking many drivers off the road and is also home to avalanches during the winter.

Atigun is known among bush pilots for the difficulty of crossing the pass with small planes; Anaktuvuk Pass is favored as the safer flying route.

The pass is often shown on the third and fourth seasons of the History Channel reality series Ice Road Truckers, which focuses on the challenges of driving on the Dalton Highway.

References

Mountain passes of Alaska
Great Divide of North America
Landforms of North Slope Borough, Alaska
Brooks Range